Yárnoz is a locality located in the municipality of Noáin, in Navarre province, Spain, Spain. As of 2020, it has a population of 22.

Geography 
Yárnoz is located 18km southeast of Pamplona.

References

Populated places in Navarre